The 1980 Holy Cross Crusaders football team was an American football team that represented the College of the Holy Cross as an independent during the 1980 NCAA Division I-A football season. Neil Wheelwright returned for his fifth year as head coach. The team compiled a record of 3–8.

All home games were played at Fitton Field on the Holy Cross campus in Worcester, Massachusetts.

Schedule

Statistical leaders
Statistical leaders for the 1980 Crusaders included: 
 Rushing: Mark Covington, 516 yards and 4 touchdowns on 152 attempts
 Passing: Dave Boisture, 1,659 yards, 113 completions and 6 touchdowns on 262 attempts
 Receiving: Brian Kelley, 639 yards and 2 touchdowns on 48 receptions
 Scoring: Matt Michaud, 26 points from 14 PATs and 4 field goals
 Total offense: Dave Boisture, 1,610 yards (1,659 passing, minus-49 rushing)
 All-purpose yards: John Ahern, 813 yards (566 receiving, 198 returning, 49 rushing)
 Interceptions: Peter George, Eric Oden and Rob Porter, 2 interceptions each (yardage: George, 23; Oden, 15; Porter, 6)
 Tackles: Jim Cobb, 127 total tackles (62 solo, 65 assist)

References

Holy Cross
Holy Cross Crusaders football seasons
Holy Cross Crusaders football